The record of Portugal at the Rugby World Cup is currently limited to a single presence in the 2007 Rugby World Cup, the tournament's sixth edition. Portugal was the last team to qualify, via a 24–23 aggregate victory over Uruguay, and was allocated to Group C along with heavy favorites New Zealand (All Blacks), Scotland, Italy and Romania. The team lost all four matches but succeeded in scoring points and one try in every match, and was able to gain a bonus point on the final game against Romania.

By position
 1987 Rugby World Cup Not invited
 1991 Rugby World Cup Did not qualify
 1995 Rugby World Cup Did not qualify
 1999 Rugby World Cup Did not qualify
 2003 Rugby World Cup Did not qualify
 2007 Rugby World Cup Eliminated in pool stage
 2011 Rugby World Cup Did not qualify
 2015 Rugby World Cup Did not qualify
 2019 Rugby World Cup Did not qualify

Matches

2007 Rugby World Cup

Overall record

Team records
Highest team score
13 – vs New Zealand 2007
10 – vs Scotland 2007
10 – vs Romania 2007
5 – vs Italy 2007

Most tries in a game
1 – vs Scotland 2007
1 – vs New Zealand 2007
1 – vs Italy 2007
1 – vs Romania 2007

Most penalty goals in a game
1 – vs Scotland, 2007
1 – vs New Zealand, 2007
1 – vs Romania, 2007

Biggest score against
108 – vs New Zealand, 2007
56 – vs Scotland, 2007
31 – vs Italy, 2007
14 – vs Romania, 2007

Worst losing margin
95 – vs New Zealand, 2007
46 – vs Scotland, 2007
26 – vs Italy, 2007
4 – vs Romania, 2007

Individual records
Most points
12 – Duarte Cardoso Pinto
6 – Gonçalo Malheiro
5 – David Penalva
5 – Rui Cordeiro
5 – Joaquim Ferreira
5 – Pedro Carvalho

Most points in a game
5 – Duarte Cardoso Pinto vs New Zealand, 2007
5 – Rui Cordeiro vs New Zealand, 2007
5 – Pedro Carvalho vs Scotland, 2007
5 – Duarte Cardoso Pinto vs Scotland, 2007
5 – David Penalva vs Italy, 2007
5 – Joaquim Ferreira vs Romania, 2007

Most tries
1 – Pedro Carvalho
1 – Rui Cordeiro
1 – Joaquim Ferreira
1 – David Penalva

Most penalty goals
2 – Duarte Cardoso Pinto
1 – Gonçalo Malheiro

Most drop goals
1 – Gonçalo Malheiro

References
 
 

Rugby World Cup by nation
World Cup